The events of 1972 in anime.

Releases

See also
1972 in animation

External links 
Japanese animated works of the year, listed in the IMDb

Anime
Anime
Years in anime